World Cup Soccer is a 1994 pinball machine designed by John Popadiuk and Larry DeMar and released by Midway. It is based on the 1994 FIFA World Cup.

Digital versions 
This table was formerly available as DLC for The Pinball Arcade until it was removed on June 30, 2018. This was previously published as World Champion Soccer, as FarSight Studios was unable to secure the World Cup license from FIFA. This digital table has many changes; the W-O-R-L-D-C-U-P lights leading to the left loop are replaced by C-H-A-M-P-I-O-N, World Cup USA 94 on the plastics between left inlanes and outlanes are renamed to Champion Soccer TPA 17, (TPA bring an abbreviation of “The Pinball Arcade” and 17 being in reference to the year it was released as DLC: 2017) and the backglass is also changed to avoid possible lawsuits from FIFA for using the tournament's mascot Striker, World Cup USA 94 name and any other references to World Cup USA 1994. without required license.
The table will be available in the 2022 game PinballFX by Zen Studios. Unlike the TPA iteration, this version is fully licensed by FIFA, after FIFA's exclusivity agreement with EA expired. As a result, the game now more closely resembles the 1994 original, with the only notable difference being an updated FIFA Licence notice on the backglass and on the playfield above the lockdown bar.

Trivia
Raiden, a character from the Mortal Kombat fighting series, makes a cameo in a bonus round.
The flyer for the machine depicts an American football field instead of a soccer field in the background.  However, the stadium shown is the Soldier Field in Chicago, which held several matches during the 1994 World Cup, among them the opening match.

References

External links
 
World Cup Soccer on Pinside.com
World Cup Soccer promo video (part 1)
World Cup Soccer promo video (part 2)
Recent Auction Results for World Cup Soccer

1994 pinball machines
Bally pinball machines
1994 FIFA World Cup